The Dictator is a 2012 political satire black comedy film co-written by and starring Sacha Baron Cohen as his fourth feature film in a leading role. The film is directed by Larry Charles, who previously directed Baron Cohen's mockumentaries Borat and Brüno. Baron Cohen, in the role of Admiral General Aladeen, the dictator of the fictional Republic of Wadiya visiting the United States, stars alongside Anna Faris, Ben Kingsley, Jason Mantzoukas, and an uncredited appearance by John C. Reilly.

Producers Jeff Schaffer and David Mandel said that Baron Cohen's character was inspired by real-life dictators like Kim Jong-il, Idi Amin, Muammar Gaddafi, Mobutu Sese Seko, and Saparmurat Niyazov. The film's opening credits dedicate it to Kim Jong-il, "in loving memory". It received mixed reviews from critics and grossed $179 million.

Plot
For 40 years, the fictional North African nation of Wadiya (shown as coterminous with the boundaries of Eritrea on a map) has been ruled by Admiral-General Haffaz Aladeen, a childish, sexist, anti-Western, and antisemitic dictator who surrounds himself with female bodyguards, sponsors terrorism (especially giving shelter to al-Qaeda leader Osama Bin Laden after "they killed his double one year ago"), changes many words in the Wadiyan dictionary to "Aladeen", and is working on developing nuclear weapons to "destroy Israel". He also refuses to sell Wadiya's oil fields, a promise he made to his father before his death. After the United Nations Security Council resolves to intervene militarily, Aladeen travels to the UN Headquarters in New York City to address the council.

Shortly after arriving, Aladeen is kidnapped by Clayton, supposedly in charge of the security preparations but actually a hitman hired by his treacherous uncle Tamir, whom Aladeen's father passed over as successor in favor of his son. Tamir then replaces Aladeen with a moronic look-alike named Efawadh, whom he intends to manipulate into signing a document nominally democratizing Wadiya while opening up the country's oil fields to foreign vested interests. Aladeen escapes after Clayton accidentally burns himself to death in a failed torture attempt. When his burnt corpse is discovered, Tamir thinks Aladeen has been killed. However, Aladeen is practically unrecognizable as Clayton shaved off his iconic beard prior to his death.

Wandering through New York City in civilian clothes, Aladeen (assuming the false identity of "Allison Burgers") encounters Zoey, a human rights activist who offers him a job at her socially progressive, alternative lifestyle co-op. Aladeen refuses the offer and encounters "Nuclear" Nadal, the former chief of Wadiya's nuclear weapons programme, whom Aladeen thought he had previously executed over an argument about the warhead's design. Aladeen follows him to New York's "Little Wadiya" district, which is populated by refugees from his own country, and meets him in "Death to Aladeen Restaurant", a restaurant run by and visited by numerous people whom Aladeen had ordered to be executed. After a failed attempt to cover up his identity, Aladeen is accused of being an "Aladeen sympathizer" by the restaurant's waiter and the refugees. Nadal saves Aladeen from being attacked and reveals to Aladeen that all the people he had ordered to be executed are instead sent into exile to the United States, as the executioner is a member of the resistance movement. Nadal agrees to help Aladeen thwart Tamir's plot and regain his power, on condition that Aladeen makes him head of Wadiya's nuclear programme again. Aladeen agrees and accepts Zoey's job offer, as she is catering at the hotel where the signing is to occur. Aladeen grows closer to Zoey after she refuses his sexual advances and teaches him how to masturbate, and eventually falls in love with her after seeing her angry. Turning around Zoey's struggling business, Aladeen begins imposing strict schedules on everyone, forming a personality cult around Zoey and intimidating an inspector into giving the store a good review.

However, Aladeen's relationship with Zoey becomes strained after he decides to be honest with her and reveal his true self; she cannot love a man who was so brutal to his own people. After acquiring a new beard taken from a corpse, Aladeen ziplines into the hotel and tells Efawadh he has recovered; his double was fooled into thinking the Supreme Leader was ill. At the signing ceremony, he tears up Tamir's document in front of the media and holds an impassioned speech praising the virtues of dictatorship, drawing unintended parallels to current issues in the United States. However, upon seeing Zoey in the room, he declares his love for her and, knowing Zoey's strongly-held views, vows to democratize his country and open up Wadiya's oil fields for business, but in a way where the general populace will benefit. Furious with Aladeen staying in power, Tamir attempts to shoot him but Efawadh jumps in front of the bullet and survives, as it is his job "to be shot in the head". Tamir is arrested afterwards.

A year later, Wadiya holds its first democratic elections, although they are rigged in favor of Aladeen (who has now added the title "President Prime Minister" to his previous Admiral-General). Afterwards, he marries Zoey, but is shocked when she breaks a glass with her foot and reveals herself to be Jewish; throughout the film he was shown vowing to destroy Israel. Scenes during the credits show Aladeen's convoy, now consisting of eco-friendly cars, Aladeen visiting a re-instated Nadal, and later Zoey revealing in a television interview that she is pregnant with the couple's first child. Aladeen responds to the news by asking if Zoey is having "a boy or an abortion".

Unrated version
The unrated cut of The Dictator runs an additional fifteen minutes from the original 83-minute theatrical version. Much of the added material is additional sexual content and dialogue. There is a scene following Aladeen falling asleep in the back of the store where one of his bodyguards, Etra, tries to kill him by beating him with her enlarged breasts on orders by Tamir. Another added scene is Mr. Ogden, the manager of the Lancaster Hotel, talking to Zoey at The Collective and cancelling the catering contract because of Aladeen.

Cast

 Sacha Baron Cohen as Admiral General/Prime Minister Haffaz Aladeen/Allison Burgers and his double Efawadh
 Jason Mantzoukas as "Nuclear" Nadal
 Anna Faris as Zoey
 Ben Kingsley as Tamir Aladeen, Aladeen's uncle 
 John C. Reilly (uncredited) as Clayton
 Bobby Lee as Mr. Lao
 Sayed Badreya as Omar Aladeen, Haffaz Aladeen's father and predecessor
 Adeel Akhtar as Maroush
 Fred Armisen as the Death to Aladeen Restaurant waiter
 Edward Norton (uncredited) as himself
 Adam LeFevre as man in Helicopter
 Megan Fox as herself
 Busty Heart as Etra
 Chris Elliott as Mr. Ogden
 Garry Shandling (uncredited) as health inspector
 Chris Parnell as News anchor
 Aasif Mandvi as Doctor
 Rizwan Manji as Patient
 Horatio Sanz as Aide on Balcony
 Fred Melamed as Head Nuclear Scientist
 Joey Slotnick as Homeless Man
 Jessica St. Clair as Denise
 Kathryn Hahn as Pregnant Woman
 Anna Katarina as Angela Merkel
 Kevin Corrigan as Slade
 J.B. Smoove as Funeral Usher
 Sondra James as Friendly Customer
 Jon Glaser as Obnoxious Customer
 Nasim Pedrad as Female GMW Host
 Mitchell Green as Joseph
 Jenny Saldana as Hannah
 David El-Badawi as Admiral General Aladeen (stunt double)

Production

Paramount Pictures described the film as "the heroic story of a North African dictator who risked his life to ensure that democracy would never come to the country he so lovingly oppressed." Paramount said the film was inspired by the novel Zabibah and the King by Iraqi dictator Saddam Hussein, though The New York Times later reported it is not an adaptation. Kristen Wiig and Gillian Jacobs had been considered for the role that Anna Faris eventually played and which Variety said "calls for strong improvisational skills". Baron Cohen, who also plays Efawadh in the film, based his performance primarily on Libya's Muammar Gaddafi. The film is dedicated to Kim Jong-il.

Morocco had been considered as a filming location. Location shooting took place at the Plaza de España in Seville and on the island of Fuerteventura, Spain, and in New York City from June to August 2011. Baron Cohen said the United Nations refused to let him film scenes inside the UN Headquarters and claimed they explained this by saying, "we represent a lot of dictators, and they are going to be very angry by this portrayal of them, so you can't shoot in there." When asked about it, UN Secretary-General Ban Ki-moon's spokesman commented by saying only, "Sacha Baron Cohen has a wonderful sense of humor." The United Nations shots were at a soundstage at Grumman Studios in Bethpage, New York.

Although Aladeen is portrayed as antisemitic and wishes to destroy Israel, the language he speaks throughout the film is actually Hebrew, as Baron Cohen is himself Jewish.

Marketing and publicity

A version of the trailer was made for a Super Bowl XLVI commercial in February 2012. Archival news footage of Barack Obama, Hillary Clinton and David Cameron in the beginning of the trailer are excerpts of their 2011 speeches condemning Colonel Gaddafi.

Internet rumors claimed the Academy of Motion Picture Arts and Sciences had banned Baron Cohen from attending the 84th Academy Awards in his role as Admiral General Aladeen, but the academy said the rumors were unfounded, saying, "We haven't banned him. We're just waiting to hear what he's going to do", and specifying of the publicity stunt: "We don't think it's appropriate. But his tickets haven't been pulled. We're waiting to hear back." Baron Cohen eventually appeared at the awards' red carpet with a pair of uniformed female bodyguards (resembling Gaddafi's Amazonian Guard) and wielding an urn purportedly containing the ashes of North Korean dictator Kim Jong-il, which the actor spilled onto E! host Ryan Seacrest. The ashes were later reported to be pancake mix.

Baron Cohen appeared in character on the May 5, 2012, episode of Saturday Night Live during the "Weekend Update" segment, in which he appeared to torture film critics A. O. Scott and Roger Ebert to give the film positive reviews, as well as seemingly holding director Martin Scorsese hostage. Baron Cohen released a video in the wake of the 2012 French Presidential Election, congratulating François Hollande on his victory, and appeared in character with the pair of uniformed female bodyguards on the May 7, 2012 episode of The Daily Show.

A publicity prank involved fake invitations that have been arriving in mailboxes in Washington D.C., according to which "President Robert Mugabe and the Ministry of Education, Sport, Art, and Culture invite you to the Premiere of The Dictator." The screening of the film would purportedly take place at Mugabe's palace in Zimbabwe on May 12.

Music

The film score was composed by Erran Baron Cohen. The Dictator – Music from the Motion Picture was released on May 8, 2012, by Aladeen Records. The majority of the songs are sung in Wadiyan despite it being a fictional language; however, it is closely associated with the German, Hungarian, and Arabic languages.

"Mundian To Bach Ke" by Panjabi MC and Jay-Z was featured in the trailers. "Hey Baby (Drop It to the Floor)" by Pitbull was featured in the second trailer.

Reception
Review aggregator Rotten Tomatoes gives the film a rating of 57% based on 222 reviews, and a rating average 5.90/10. The site's critical consensus reads, "Wildly uneven but consistently provocative, The Dictator is a decent entry in the poli-slapstick comedy genre." On Metacritic, the film was given score of 58 out of 100 based on 41 critics, indicating "mixed or average reviews". Audiences polled by CinemaScore during opening weekend gave the film an average grade of "C" on a scale ranging from A+ to F.

Roger Ebert of the Chicago Sun-Times gave the film three stars out of a possible four, saying, "The Dictator is funny, in addition to being obscene, disgusting, scatological, vulgar, crude and so on. Having seen Sacha Baron Cohen promoting it on countless talk shows, I feared the movie would feel like déjà vu. But no. He establishes a claim to be the best comic filmmaker now working. And in a speech about dictatorships, he practices merciless political satire." Slant Magazine conversely concluded, "bound to be one of the year's biggest comedy letdowns, The Dictator doesn't so much stir hot-button issues as showcase a great satirist off his game." Keith Uhlich of Time Out approved, giving it four stars out of five, and calling the opening scenes in the film "a brisk, hilarious jeremiad" and its ending monologue "a rousing, uproarious climactic speech worthy of both Chaplin and Team America."

Several reviews noted that the Marx Brothers' 1933 film, Duck Soup, inspired parts of Baron Cohen's 2012 film.
Scott Tobias of The A.V. Club noted that "Admiral General Aladeen and Rufus T. Firefly share the same bloodline, representing a more generalized contempt for world leaders of any stripe, whether they don a 'supreme beard' or a greasepaint moustache." Scott Wilson of the Nashville Scene detected "an echo here of that funniest of xenophobe-baiting funnies, Duck Soup." Peter Travers of the Rolling Stone claimed that Baron Cohen's film "dodges soothing convention and ultimately merits comparisons to the Marx Brothers' Duck Soup and Charlie Chaplin's The Great Dictator."

The Irish Examiner wrote that “Sacha Baron Cohen atones for the sins of 'Bruno' with this gleefully bad-taste fish-out-of-water comedy, which kicks sand in the eye of political correctness” and that “no subject is off limits – the September 11 attacks, rape, sexual equality, Judaism – and Larry Charles's film tramples merrily over social taboos, hitting more targets than it misses as the titular despot runs amok in the capitalist playground of New York City.“

The Times argued that “with The Dictator, Sacha Baron Cohen makes a radical break with the comedic style of his past films. Gone is the con-man comedian, fooling celebrities and the public with fictional characters. Gone, too, is the mockumentary style that he and his director on Borat, Bruno and now this film, Larry Charles, made their own. The Dictator is the kind of conventional feature that Peter Sellers, Tony Hancock or even Mike Myers could have made.” The publication also claimed that “it's likely to offend prudes of both the sexually and politically correct persuasions.”

The Washington Post wrote that “Cohen has thankfully dispensed with ambushing real-life people for squirm-inducing interviews. But an early stunt involving a Wii game based on the 1972 Munich Olympics falls flatter than a stale matzo, a running gag about Hollywood stars selling sexual favors quickly loses steam and it can be stipulated that rape jokes simply aren't funny.”

Censorship
The film is banned in several member-countries of the Commonwealth of Independent States, in particular nations with real-life leaders commonly described as dictators, including Belarus and Tajikistan, described as "unlikely" to be shown in Turkmenistan, shortened to 71 minutes by the censorship in Uzbekistan, and banned from screens two weeks after its premiere in Kazakhstan. Rumours were circulating that the film has been also informally banned from showing in Belarus, but state officials denied this referring to deficiency of properly equipped movie theaters suitable for showing the film distributed exclusively in digital format.

Outside of the CIS, only the censored version of the film was released in Pakistan, and the film was reportedly blocked from theaters in Malaysia. In Italy, the reference to the "Italian Prime Minister" in the scene with Megan Fox was substituted by a generic "politician" to avoid reference to the then-Prime Minister of Italy, Silvio Berlusconi.

The film has been described by some critics as being Islamophobic, particularly noting the pronounced stereotype of Middle Eastern dictators, which are mostly Muslims.

See also
 The Great Dictator, Charlie Chaplin's 1940 satire of German dictator Adolf Hitler. It also features a double of the dictator but its final monologue is in praise of democracy.
 The Interview, Seth Rogen and James Franco's 2014 satire of North Korean dictator Kim Jong-un.
 Street Fighter, a 1994 Martial arts film starring Jean-Claude Van Damme, Kylie Minogue, Ming-na Wen, and Raul Julia.
 Coming to America, a film starring Eddie Murphy as an African prince who travels to the United States and falls in love with an American woman.

References

External links

 
 
 
 
 

2012 black comedy films
2012 films
American political satire films
American slapstick comedy films
British black comedy films
British political satire films
British slapstick comedy films
American satirical films
British satirical films
2010s satirical films
American black comedy films
Fictional dictators
Films directed by Larry Charles
Films produced by Scott Rudin
Films set in a fictional country
Films set in Africa
Films set in Brooklyn
British films set in New York City
Films shot in Morocco
Films shot in New York City
Films shot in Spain
Films shot in the Canary Islands
Paramount Pictures films
Films with screenplays by Alec Berg
Films with screenplays by David Mandel
Films with screenplays by Jeff Schaffer
Films with screenplays by Sacha Baron Cohen
2010s political films
Censored films
Films scored by Erran Baron Cohen
Cultural depictions of Angela Merkel
2010s English-language films
2010s American films
2010s British films